Solitaire is a large deep-sea pipe laying ship. When fully operational she has a crew of 420, a pipe carrying capacity of 22,000 tonnes and a pipe lay speed of more than 9 km a day. The ship is owned by the Allseas Group, a Dutch pipelaying and marine construction firm with their headquarters in Switzerland.

History 
The ship was initially built in 1972 as a bulk carrier and launched as Trentwood by Mitsubishi Heavy Industries at their shipyard in Hiroshima, Japan.

In 1992, Allseas acquired Trentwood for conversion into a pipelay vessel. Allseas awarded the conversion contract to Sembawang Shipyards in Singapore on a lump sum basis; however, the contract was terminated in 1995. The ship was subsequently converted at the Swan Hunter yard on Tyneside, United Kingdom. Solitaire laid her first pipe on Statoil's Europipe project in 1999.

Allseas and Sembcorp reached a settlement for the Solitaire arbitration in 2006.

In 2006, while working on the Atwater Valley and Independence Trail projects in the Gulf of Mexico, Solitaire set new depth records, laying 10-inch pipeline in 2775 m (9100 ft) water depth and 24-inch pipeline in 2550 m (8370 ft) water depth.

Among other ships, Solitaire laid the Nord Stream 2 gas pipeline in the Baltic Sea in 2019—2020.

References

External links
 2min , from Mighty Ships

1971 ships
Ships of the Netherlands
Crane vessels
Pipe-laying ships